Sofía Gómez Villafane (born 15 April 1994) is an Argentine cross-country mountain biker and cyclo-cross cyclist. She represented Argentina at the 2020 Summer Olympics in Women's cross-country.

Career 
She was raised in Esquel, Patagonia until she was twelve, before moving with her family to Los Gatos, California. The fifth child of six, she discovered mountain biking through the NorCal High School Mountain Bike Program, and her brother found her a bike on Craigslist for $500. She went on to compete at the collegiate level for Fort Lewis College in Durango, Colorado, where she received a Bachelor’s in exercise science and a minor in business administration.

She races primarily in North America and is the 2019 Argentine national cross-country champion.

She won the 2019 Epic Rides series, defeating World Cup champion Kate Courtney in the final race. At the 2019 Pan American Games, in Lima, Peru, she won a silver medal in the cross-country race.

In 2021, she became the first female mountain biker to compete in the Olympics for Argentina since 2004 by qualifying to compete in the cross-country event.

Personal life
She and her boyfriend, Keegan Swenson, met through mountain biking in 2012. They regularly train and travel to competitions together.

Villafañe resides in Heber City, Utah, United States. She has a dual American and Argentine nationality.

References

External links

1994 births
Living people
Argentine female cyclists
Cyclists at the 2020 Summer Olympics
Olympic cyclists of Argentina
Pan American Games silver medalists for Argentina
Pan American Games medalists in cycling
Cyclists at the 2019 Pan American Games
Medalists at the 2019 Pan American Games
21st-century Argentine women